Quiet Storm is the fifth album by the band Cockney Rejects, released in 1984.

Track listing 
 "It Ain't Nothing" - 4.30
 "I Saw the Light" - 4.26
 "Back to the Start" - 6.01
 "I Can't Forget" - 4.12
 "Feeling My Way" - 3.26
 "Quiet Storm" - 3.02
 "Leave It" - 3.49
 "Fourth Summer" - 2.31
 "Jog On" - 4.35

Personnel 
Cockney Rejects
Keith Warrington - drums 
Micky Geggus - guitar, bass 
Jefferson Turner - vocals 
Ian Campbell - bass

References

1984 albums
Cockney Rejects albums